Vision is an IRC (Internet Relay Chat) client for BeOS.

Vision is a FOSS, and its source code is distributed and developed under the Mozilla Public License. The community is encouraged to contribute to the project.

Vision is the main IRC application in Haiku and IRC channels contribute the most in the development of Haiku. Development Discussions and other queries are discussed in these channels. Vision is bundled with Haiku and the Haiku version is set up in such a way that it automatically connects to the development channel when executed.

Design 

The main goal of the team was to create a fast and elegant IRC to make it easy to chat, discuss and solve queries.

The network, settings, and preferences can be customized on the setup screen.

There is a General Preferences Window where users can change the color and fonts and can customize the app. There is a Network Preferences Window where the user can change servers and add commons. Users can update their personal details here and can add or remove nicknames.

Users can edit, add or remove servers on the Network Data Window.

Development history 

Axel Dörfler was chosen as the lead developer for this project. Vision was registered on 5 February 2001. Dörfler reported a successful run of the application in 2006 and the software was frequently updated afterwards in an attempt to further simplify it.

References 

Haiku